Per Knudsen (11 May 1930 – 9 May 2006) was a Norwegian footballer. He played in four matches for the Norway national football team from 1955 to 1956, and spent his club career in Vålerenga.

References

1930 births
2006 deaths
Norwegian footballers
Norway international footballers
Vålerenga Fotball players
Place of birth missing
Association football forwards